Spain is a studio album by Michel Camilo and Tomatito, released in 2000. It was recorded at Carriage House Studios in August 1999 and published by Universal Music under various labels around the world.

Track listing 
Spain Intro (Joaquin Rodrigo)
Spain (Chick Corea)
Bésame Mucho (Consuelo Velázquez)
A Mi Niño José (Tomatito)
Two Much / Love Theme (Michel Camilo)
Para Troilo y Salgán (Luis Salinas)
La Vacilona (Tomatito)
Aire de Tango (Luis Salinas)

Credits 
Michel Camilo - Piano, Producer, Arrangements
Tomatito - Spanish Guitar
Julio Martí - Executive Producer
Phil Magnotti - Recording, Mixing and Mastering Engineer
John Shylosky - Assistant Recording Engineer

Album reception 
The album was very well received by critics and the public in general, winning Best Latin Jazz Album in the first-ever Latin Grammy Awards.

References

See also 
Michel Camilo Discography

2000 albums
Michel Camilo albums
Latin Grammy Award for Best Latin Jazz Album